The 13th Legislative Assembly of British Columbia sat from 1913 to 1916. The members were elected in the British Columbia general election held in March 1912. The British Columbia Conservative Party led by Richard McBride formed the government. McBride resigned as premier in December 1915 to become British Columbia's agent general in London. William John Bowser succeeded McBride as Premier.

David McEwen Eberts served as speaker.

Members of the 13th General Assembly 
The following members were elected to the assembly in 1912.:

Notes:

Party standings

By-elections 
By-elections were held for the following members appointed to the provincial cabinet, as was required at the time:
 Lorne Argyle Campbell, Minister of Mines, elected March 1, 1916
 Charles Edward Tisdall, Minister of Public Works, defeated by Malcolm Archibald Macdonald, Liberal, March 1, 1916

By-elections were held to replace members for various other reasons:

Notes:

Other changes
Parker Williams is expelled from the Socialist Party for also holding membership in the Social Democratic Party. On May 15, 1916, he is expelled from the Social Democrats and becomes an Independent Socialist.

References 

Political history of British Columbia
Terms of British Columbia Parliaments
1913 establishments in British Columbia
1916 disestablishments in British Columbia
20th century in British Columbia